Zach Edey (born May 14, 2002) is a Canadian college basketball player for the Purdue Boilermakers of the Big Ten Conference. At the close of the 2023 season, Edey was named the Big Ten Player of the Year and Sporting News National Player of the Year.

Edey also represented Canada at the 2021 FIBA Under-19 Basketball World Cup in Latvia.

Early life and high school career
Zach Edey was born in Toronto on May 14, 2002, to Julia and Glen Edey. His  mother was born to Chinese immigrants in Toronto, where she grew up and played basketball; his father is white. Edey grew up playing ice hockey as well as baseball, which his father also played growing up. As a sophomore at Leaside High School in Toronto, Edey started playing basketball with the Northern Kings Amateur Athletic Union program. He only committed to the game when his exceptional height made baseball impractical, as his strike zone impacted his ability to play. 

Edey moved to the United States and attended IMG Academy in Bradenton, Florida. He joined their  second-tier team in his first year, working daily with IMG coach and former National Basketball Association (NBA) player Daniel Santiago. Edey was promoted to the school's national team the following year. A consensus three-star recruit, he reclassified to the 2020 class and committed to playing college basketball for Purdue over offers from Baylor and Santa Clara, among others.

College career

Freshman season 
On March 2, 2021, he recorded a season-high 21 points and seven rebounds off the bench in a 73–69 win over Wisconsin. Sharing playing time with fellow center Trevion Williams, he averaged 8.7 points, 4.4 rebounds and 1.1 blocks in 14 minutes per game, earning Big Ten All-Freshman Team honors.

Sophomore season 
To begin his sophomore year, Edey moved into a starting role. On January 3, 2022, he recorded a then-career-high 24 points and 10 rebounds in 20 minutes in a 74–69 loss to Wisconsin. On February 26, 2022, Edey recorded a career-high 25 points in 22 minutes in a 68–65 loss to Michigan State. As a sophomore, he averaged career highs in every category except free throw percentage, averaging 14.4 points, 7.7 rebounds, 1.1 assists, and 1.2 blocks in only 19 minutes per game. Following the conclusion of the season, Edey was named to the Second Team All-Big Ten.

Junior season 
On December 17, 2022, Edey became both the 55th player in Purdue's history to reach 1,000 career points and the 11th player in Purdue's history to reach 100 career blocks.

During the 2022-23 season, Edey received Big Ten Player of the Week six times, tying the school record for most awards in a single season (Caleb Swanigan, 2016-17) and rising to second most all-time in men's basketball in the Big Ten (Evan Turner, 2010-11).

At the close of the season, Edey was named the Big Ten Player of the Year and Sporting News National Player of the Year. He was also named a consensus first-team All-American.

National team career
Edey represented Canada at the 2021 FIBA Under-19 Basketball World Cup in Latvia. He averaged 15.1 points, a tournament-high 14.1 rebounds and 2.3 blocks per game, leading his team to the bronze medal and being named to the all-tournament team.

On May 24, 2022, Edey agreed to a three-year commitment to play with the Canadian senior men's national team.

Career statistics

College

|-
| style="text-align:left;"| 2020–21
| style="text-align:left;"| Purdue
| 28 || 2 || 14.7 || .597 || – || .714 || 4.4 || .4 || .1 || 1.1 || 8.7
|-
| style="text-align:left;"| 2021–22
| style="text-align:left;"| Purdue
| 37 || 33 || 19.0 || .648 || – || .649 || 7.7 || 1.2 || .2 || 1.2 || 14.4
|-
| style="text-align:left;"| 2022–23
| style="text-align:left;"| Purdue
| 33 || 33 || 31.6 || .606 || – || .736 || 12.8 || 1.5 || .2 || 2.1 || 22.3
|- class="sortbottom"
| style="text-align:center;" colspan="2"| Career
| 98 || 68 || 22.0 || .619 || – || .702 || 8.3 || 1.1 || .2 || 1.5 || 15.4

References

External links
Purdue Boilermakers bio

2002 births
Living people
All-American college men's basketball players
Basketball players from Toronto
Canadian expatriate basketball people in the United States
Canadian men's basketball players
Canadian people of Chinese descent
Centers (basketball)
IMG Academy alumni
Purdue Boilermakers men's basketball players